Alexander Kerr (born 1970) is an American violinist. He is currently the Linda and Jack Gill Chair in Music at Jacobs School of Music, Indiana University, and the concertmaster of the Dallas Symphony Orchestra.  He was formerly the concertmaster of the Royal Concertgebouw Orchestra and the Charleston Symphony Orchestra.

References

Living people
Indiana University faculty
American violinists
Curtis Institute of Music alumni
21st-century violinists
1970 births